Oddvar Barlie (24 June 1929 – 10 January 2017) was a Norwegian sport wrestler. He was born in Oslo and represented the club Oslo Bryteklubb. He competed at the 1960 Summer Olympics in Rome, where he placed tied tenth in Greco-Roman wrestling, the middleweight class. He was a brother of wrestler Harald Barlie. He was an uncle of Ine Barlie and Mette Barlie and granduncle of Lene Barlie, all wrestlers.

References

External links
 

1929 births
2017 deaths
Sportspeople from Oslo
Olympic wrestlers of Norway
Wrestlers at the 1960 Summer Olympics
Norwegian male sport wrestlers